Catherine Eve Poole  (born 5 February 1972) is a British writer. In 2022, she was Interim CEO at the Royal Society of Edinburgh, having served as the Third Church Estates Commissioner from April 2018 to October 2021, one of the most senior lay people in the Church of England. She was the first female Chairman of the Board of Governors at Gordonstoun, a private school in Moray, Scotland, from 2015-2021. Her books include Capitalism's Toxic Assumptions and Leadersmithing, which was Highly Commended in the 2018 Business Book of the Year Awards. She received an OBE for services to education and gender equality in the 2023 New Year Honours List.

Early life and education 
Poole was born on 5 February 1972. One of four children, she was educated at Madras College in St Andrews and at Westminster School (Connecticut), having received a scholarship from The English-Speaking Union. She studied theology at Durham University and was awarded a BA in 1993 before going on to work for the Church Commissioners. She graduated with a Master of Business Administration (MBA) degree from the University of Edinburgh in 1998. She completed a Doctor of Philosophy (PhD) degree in Divinity at Newnham College, Cambridge, in 2010 with a thesis titled From the fall of The Wall to the collapse of credit, Church of England views on capitalism 1989–2008.

Career 
Poole started her career working for the Church Commissioners for England between 1993 and 1997. From 1998 to 2002, she worked as a Change management consultant for Deloitte, specialising in capital markets and the public sector. In 2002, she joined the faculty at Ashridge Executive Education to teach leadership and was the Deputy Director of the Public Leadership Centre and ran  programmes for the Foreign and Commonwealth Office, the BBC, the Ministry of Defence, Tesco and local government.

This unusual combination of careers has made her a frequent commentator on ethics in public life and about how leaders should behave at work. She is a regular contributor to Thought for the Day for BBC Radio Scotland.

In June 2015, she became the first female Chair of the Board of Governors of Gordonstoun School.

In 2018, Poole became the Third Church Estates Commissioner, one of the most senior lay people in the Church of England, in succession to Andrew Mackie. As Commissioner, she was a member of the Church Commissioners' Board of Governors and the General Synod of the Church of England. She also chaired the Bishoprics & Cathedrals Committee and the Mission, Pastoral and Church Property Committee. During her term she successfully introduced the Cathedrals Measure 2021, which modernises cathedral governance and places Church of England cathedrals under the regulatory ambit of the Charity Commission for the first time.

Prior to taking up the role of Third Church Estates Commissioner, Poole was a research fellow of the William Temple Foundation and the St Paul's Institute. She also served on the management boards of Theos and of Faith in Business at Ridley Hall, Cambridge. She was a founding director of the Foundation for Workplace Spirituality (2007–2014), a trustee of the Foundation for Church Leadership (2006–2012), and trustee and deputy chair of the Christian Association of Business Executives (2005–2011). She is a Life Fellow of the Royal Society of Arts and a visiting scholar at Sarum College.

Poole was appointed Officer of the Order of the British Empire (OBE) in the 2023 New Year Honours for services to education and gender equality.

Selected works 

 The Church on Capitalism: Theology and the Market (2010) 
 Ethical Leadership: Global Challenges and Perspectives (2011, with Carla Millar) 
 Capitalism's Toxic Assumptions: Redefining Next Generation Economics (2015) 
 Leadersmithing: Revealing the Trade Secrets of Leadership (2017) 
 Buying God: Consumerism and Theology (2018)

References 

1972 births
Living people
Church Estates Commissioners
British Anglicans
Alumni of the University of Edinburgh
Alumni of Newnham College, Cambridge
Alumni of Trevelyan College, Durham
Officers of the Order of the British Empire